Jonathan "Jonty" Learoyd (born 3 November 2000) is a former French ski jumper. He also has a British citizenship as both his parents originate from London.

Career 

He took three silver medals at 2017 European Youth Olympic Winter Festival in Erzurum. He made his World Cup debut on 16 December 2017 in Engelberg, Switzerland and finished at 35th place.

World Cup results

Standings

Individual starts (14)

References

External links 

2000 births
Living people
French male ski jumpers
French people of English descent
Olympic ski jumpers of France
Ski jumpers at the 2018 Winter Olympics
Sportspeople from Albertville
Ski jumpers at the 2016 Winter Youth Olympics
21st-century French people